The 2002 LPGA Championship was the 48th LPGA Championship, played June 6–9 at DuPont Country Club in Wilmington, Delaware.

Se Ri Pak, age 24, won the second of her three LPGA Championships, three strokes ahead of runner-up Beth Daniel, the 54-hole leader and champion in 1990. It was the fourth of Pak's five major titles; at the time, she was the youngest woman to win four major titles. Daniel, age 45, was attempting to become the oldest winner of a major in LPGA history, but carded a final round 77.

Annika Sörenstam shot 65 to climb up the leaderboard into third; she won the next three editions of this championship.

The DuPont Country Club hosted the LPGA Championship for eleven consecutive seasons, from 1994 through 2004.

Past champions in the field

Made the cut

Source:

Missed the cut

Source:

Final leaderboard
Sunday, June 9, 2002

Source:

References

External links
Golf Observer leaderboard
DuPont Country Club

Women's PGA Championship
Golf in Delaware
LPGA Championship
LPGA Championship
LPGA Championship
LPGA Championship
Women's sports in Delaware